Eupithecia maerkerata is a moth in the  family Geometridae. It is found in the United Arab Emirates.

References

Moths described in 1961
maerkerata
Moths of Asia